The WRAL Soccer Center is a soccer complex featuring a 3,200-seat, lighted soccer-specific stadium located on Perry Creek Road in Raleigh, North Carolina.  It is situated between Capital Boulevard (US Route 1) and Louisburg Road (NC Route 401), and just north of Interstate 540.  The complex features a total of 25 soccer pitches.  Two of the 25 fields are configurable into smaller pitches and are composed of FieldTurf.  The stadium is located in the middle of the park.

The site is the home field for the North Carolina FC Youth, which is one of the largest youth soccer organizations in North Carolina.  The central stadium is home to the Wake Technical Community College soccer team. It is also the site for several large youth soccer tournaments, including four weekends in November and December every year when the North Carolina FC Youth Shootout and the North Carolina FC Yough Showcase events are hosted.

External links
WRAL Soccer Center at Google Maps

Sports in Raleigh-Durham
Sports venues in North Carolina
Soccer venues in North Carolina
1981 establishments in North Carolina
Sports venues completed in 1981
Sports complexes in the United States